Chaplain (Major General) Robert Preston Taylor, USAF (April 11, 1909 – February 1, 1997) was an American military officer who served as the 3rd Chief of Chaplains of the United States Air Force.  A graduate of Baylor University in Waco, Texas, he notably served as a chaplain during World War II and was a prisoner of war and survivor of the Bataan Death March. He began his tenure as chief of chaplains on September 1, 1962, and served until his retirement on August 1, 1966.

References

1909 births
1997 deaths
Chiefs of Chaplains of the United States Air Force
United States Air Force generals
American prisoners of war in World War II
Bataan Death March prisoners
World War II chaplains
Recipients of the Silver Star
20th-century American clergy